The Renfe Class 354 was a series of eight diesel hydraulic locomotives manufactured by Krauss-Maffei in Germany specifically to pull Talgo pendular coaches which were introduced shortly before the acquisition of these machines.

The appearance and design is very similar to the Renfe Class 353, but with improvements; specifically in terms of installed power.

Background and design

The locomotives represent a steadily increasing requirement for engine power, from the Class 352, to the Class 353, and then to these engines, with over 800 hp more power. Such high power was needed to drag the new Talgo tilting trains, which thanks to their natural pendulation system can be used with higher lateral acceleration than conventional trains, passing through curves at up to 25% faster. With these locomotives a maximum speed of this train was originally .

Initially, they were delivered in the same livery as the Talgo pendular, i.e. white and blue. Later they received the Grandes Lineas livery, also based on white and blue, (in July 1998  354-003 was the first to receive it). In 2004 the logo 'Talgo' was removed from the sides of the locomotives - a minor change.

The class later received improvements such as sound-proofing of the cabin and air conditioning equipment (fitted on the roof).

Operations
The first unit arrived in 1982 and was tested on the lines of Madrid - Villalba, Madrid - Almeria, Madrid - El Goloso and Madrid - Alcázar de San Juan. The machines were assigned to the depot at Madrid-Aravaca.

Initially the units worked on the Talgo pendular Madrid - A Coruña and alongside the Class 353 on the Talgo pendular Madrid - Paris (at far as the gauge change at Irún). From 25 May 1983: the beginning of the summer service they were also used to pull the Talgo pendular Madrid - Cadiz replacing the electric Japanese Renfe Class 269 which had experienced difficulties due to a non-compensated overhead lines.

Tests conducted with 354-002 and 354-003 between Seville and Jerez had achieved a speed of  without encountering any significant problems. However breakdowns of the hydraulic transmissions occur, whilst some units still being in production at the Krauss-Maffei factory in Munich; the unfinished units have the problem corrected before being delivered.

When the eight units became redundant on the Talgo Pendular they were used on conventional trains fitted with a generator van of type "DDT 9450". On 20 February 1984, they replaced the 333.0 on the Extremadura Expreso (Madrid - Badajoz), on 3 June they also began to be used on the Rias Altas Express (Madrid - A Coruña.) These services ceased in 1986. Next they were to be seen working the Lusitania expreso between Madrid and Talavera de la Reina.

In 1986 the machines are upgraded for 200 km/h operations making them the fastest in Spain at that time, in 1988, when Renfe decides to reduce the maximum speed the Japanese designed locomotives to 140 km/h the Class 354 along with the Renfe Class 250 become the only machines that can to ensure operations at 160 km/h.

In 1989 a study is undertaken to convert them to normal operations, but does not proceed very far.

In 1990 they start to work the TALGO train : Madrid - Gijón. 1993 sees them replacing Class 353 units on the Talgo Mare nostrum between Valencia and Cartagena. The same year sees 354-008 out of commercial service and being used to conduct further high speed tests on the new Madrid - Seville line, the unit returned to commercial service in November of that year. An accident in May 1995 means the same unit will be out of action for a year.

The turn of the century brings a series of serious accidents:
4 October 2001, 354-001 catches fire.
3 June 2003, 354-007 is completely destroyed in collision with the 333-304.
21 May 2004, a head-on collision on Talgo Madrid - Pontevedra - A Coruña line completely destroys 354-002 and 354-003.
4 January, 353-004 derails at Tobarra, requiring repairs.

At the end of this black series of events the three remaining locomotives are confined to the Talgo pendular between Madrid and Badajoz, and Madrid and Cartagena.

Fleet details
Like all Talgo locomotives, the Class 354 received names

See also
Renfe Class 352, Renfe Class 353 - predecessor classes, also designed primarily for use with Talgo carriages.

Notes

References

Literature

External links
Las interminables jornadas de las locomotoras de la serie 354 de Renfe

Railway locomotives introduced in 1983
Diesel locomotives of Spain
354
Talgo
Renfe high-speed trains
5 ft 6 in gauge locomotives
Krauss-Maffei locomotives
Passenger locomotives